The Nokia N95 is a smartphone produced by Nokia as part of their Nseries line of portable devices. Announced in September 2006, it was released to the market in March 2007. The N95 ran S60 3rd Edition, on Symbian OS v9.2. It has a two-way sliding mechanism, which can be used to access either media playback buttons or a numeric keypad. It was first released in silver and later on in black, with limited edition quantities in gold and purple.

The N95 was a high-end model that was marketed as a "multimedia computer", much like other Nseries devices. It featured a then-high 5 megapixel resolution digital camera with Carl Zeiss optics and with a flash, as well as a then-large display measuring 2.6 inches. It was also Nokia's first device with a built-in Global Positioning System (GPS) receiver, used for maps or turn-by-turn navigation, and their first with an accelerometer. It was also one of the earliest devices in the market supporting HSDPA (3.5G) signals.

After the introduction of the original model (technically named N95-1), several updated versions were released, most notably the N95 8GB with 8 gigabytes of internal storage, a larger display and improved battery. The 'classic' N95 and its upgraded variant N95 8GB are widely considered as breakthrough devices at the time of their launch. The N95 was well-regarded for its camera, GPS and mapping capabilities, and its innovative dual-slider form factor, and some have hailed it as one of the best mobile devices to have been released.

History 
The phone was unveiled on 26 September 2006 at the Nokia Open Studio 2006 event in New York City. It was considered to have been a turning point in the mobile industry due to its various capabilities; however, the device took a further six months until it was released. On 8 March 2007, Nokia was shipping N95 in key European, Asian, and Middle Eastern markets. It was on sale in many more countries during the week of 11 March. The N95 was still only available in limited quantities at this early stage and therefore its price was briefly raised to 800 euros.

On 7 April 2007, the N95 went on sale in the United States through Nokia's Flagship stores in New York and Chicago and through Nokia's nseries.com website. No US carriers were expected to offer this phone.   The U.S. version started retailing without carrier branding or discounts in Nokia's flagship stores in New York and Chicago on 26 September 2007.

On 29 August 2007, two updated versions of the N95 were announced at a press event in London; first, the N95-2 (N95 8 GB), an updated version for the European/Asian markets with 8 gigabytes of internal storage and larger screen; secondly, the N95-3 (N95 NAM), replacing the original 2100 MHz W-CDMA air interface with support for the 850 MHz and 1900 MHz frequencies used for the 3G networks of most GSM-compatible mobile carriers in the Americas, including AT&T Mobility.

Finally, later on 7 January 2008, Nokia introduced the N95-4, which is the US 8 GB version of the N95-3. The phone got its FCC approval on 30 January and launched 18 March. The first carrier to utilise this approval was Rogers Wireless in May 2009. Also at CES 2008, a red-coloured limited edition Nokia N95 was announced and released that year.

The N95's main competitors during its lifetime were the LG Prada, Apple's iPhone (1st generation), Sony Ericsson's W950i and K850. The N95 managed to outsell its rivals. Despite Apple's much-hyped iPhone with its multi-touch technology, thin design and advanced web capabilities, the N95 had several key features against the iPhone, such as its camera with flash, video camera, Bluetooth file sharing, 3G and 3.5G connectivity, GPS, third-party applications and several other features.

Features

Integrated GPS ability 
The N95 contained an integrated GPS receiver which was located below the 0 key on the keypad. The phone ships with Nokia Maps navigation software.

Multimedia features 

Out of the box, the N95 supported audio in MP3, WMA, RealAudio, SP-MIDI, AAC+, eAAC+, MIDI, AMR, and M4A formats. Its two-way slide, when opened towards the keypad, allowed access to its media playback buttons. A standard 3.5 mm jack is located on the left side of the phone and allowed the user to connect any standard headphones to the unit. With the AD-43 headset adapter the N95 introduced support for multiple remote control buttons on the headset. Users can also use Bluetooth for audio output using A2DP, or use the built-in stereo speakers. The N95 is also capable of playing video in 3GP, MPEG4, RealVideo, and, in newer firmware, Flash Video formats. All of the phone's video output could also be played through the TV-out feature. TV-out is a feature offered by the phones OMAP processor, that allowed users to connect the smartphone, using the supplied cable, to a TV or any other composite video input. Its main purpose was to allow users to show photos and videos on a large screen. The N95's built in UPnP capabilities also allowed the user to share the phones' media over a WLAN network. This provides easy access to the photos, music, and videos stored on the phone, from other UPnP capable devices on the network, enabling them to be watched or downloaded over the air.

Internet 

The N95 had built-in Wi-Fi, with which it could access the Internet (through an 802.11b/g wireless network). The N95 could also connect to the Internet through a carrier packet data network such as UMTS, HSDPA, or EDGE. The webkit-based browser displayed full web pages as opposed to simplified pages as on most other phones. Web pages may be viewed in portrait or landscape mode and automatic zooming was supported. The N95 also has built-in Bluetooth and works with wireless earpieces that use Bluetooth 2.0 technology and for file transfer.

The original N95 did not support US-based versions of UMTS/HSDPA; UMTS features in these versions of the phone are disabled by default. Furthermore, the later N95 US versions support only AT&T's 850/1900 MHz UMTS/HSDPA bands, neither 1700 MHz of T-Mobile USA nor 2100 MHz bands are supported internationally.

The phone could also act as a WAN access point allowing a tethered PC access to a carrier's packet data network. VoIP software and functionality is also included with the phone (though some carriers have opted to remove this feature).

Accelerometer 
The N95 included a built-in accelerometer. This was originally only used for video stabilization and photo orientation (to keep landscape or portrait shots oriented as taken).

Nokia Research Center allowed an application interface directly to the accelerometer, allowing software to use the data from it. Nokia has released a step counter application to demonstrate this. Another Nokia-created application taking advantage of the accelerometer is Nokia Sports Tracker.

Third-party programs were created, including software that will automatically change the screen orientation when the phone is tilted, a program that simulates the sounds of a Star Wars lightsaber when the phone is waved through the air, a program allowing the user to mute the phone by turning it face-down, etc.

N-Gage 
The N95 was compatible with the N-Gage mobile gaming service.

Reception
The N95 was much talked about after announcement but was initially viewed as a niche feature-packed device. However it became a huge sales success for Nokia when released in most regions. 7 million Nokia N95 units were sold by the end of 2007. In its Q1 2008 report, Nokia claimed that 3 million N95 (including 8GB variant) units were shipped that quarter, bringing the total to at least 10 million. It managed to outsell rivals such as LG Viewty and iPhone.

Its camera capabilities put it in competition with phones such as Sony Ericsson K850i.

On 6 November 2007, AllAboutSymbian declared the N95 8GB as the "best smartphone ever". Years later on 24 January 2013, PC Magazine described the Nokia N95 as "One of the best smartphones in history on any platform".

A slightly improved model in a candybar form called Nokia N82 was released in late 2007. The next year saw the introduction of the Nokia N96.

Specification sheet

Variations

N95 8GB (N95-2)

A revision of the N95, called N95 8 GB (N95-2, internally known as RM-320), was announced on 29 August 2007, and released in October 2007. It was released in a black color, instead of silver like the N95-1.

Because of this new model, the original N95 is often referred to as N95 Classic.

The changes compared to the original N95 are:

Improvements
 8 GB separate internal memory
 128 MB RAM (up from 64 MB), 95 MB available.
 Demand paging (although the  N95 supports this too, since firmware version 20.0.015)
 1200 mAh battery (BL-6F), up from 950 mAh
 Cosmetic changes to media and front-panel buttons
 New model of handsfree/remote control, AD-54 (as opposed to AD-43 for previous N95 versions)
 New multimedia menu, with Nokia's Ovi content integration
 Built-in Automatic Screen Rotation (ASR) in software versions v20.0.016 onwards for the N95 8 GB version and from v30.0.015 for N95-1, respectively.
 Black faceplate instead of the original silver.
 Sturdier battery cover.

Negative changes
 Pixel density was 142 DPI, compared to 153 DPI for the N95; this is due to the larger display but with the same resolution (QVGA)
 MicroSD slot removed
 Slider protecting camera lens was removed to make room for the larger battery; the camera application is now started by holding down the shutter release button
 Removal of built-in video editor (later added with the firmware upgrades)
 Mass: 128 g, up 8 g from 120 g

N95 NAM (N95-3) 
The Nokia N95-3 was a revision of the N95, internally designated as RM-160, designed specifically for the North American market. It was also available in Australian and South American market.

The following was changed from the original version:
 128 MB RAM, up from 64 MB.
 WCDMA (HSDPA) 850 and 1900 MHz, instead of 2100 MHz.
 1200 mAh battery, up from 950 mAh.
 Talk time up to 190 min (WCDMA), up to 250 min (GSM).
 Slider protecting camera lens removed to make room for the larger battery.
 Camera flash moved to the vertical axis of the phone, so when the phone is used as a camera it sits to the side of the camera, instead of below as in the N95-1.
 Cosmetic changes to media buttons.
 Height: 2.05 cm, down from 2.10 cm.
 Mass: 125 g, up from 120 g.
 White keyboard light instead of blue for visibility improvement.
 Current firmware version V 35.2.001, 13-10-09, RM-160

N95 8GB NAM (N95-4) 
The main differences to the N95-2 were:
 Camera lens was now more flush with the phone's face.
 Multimedia keys were less glossy.

Both N95-3 and N95-4 also had some additional changes, such as the removal of the sliding lens cover for the camera, improved battery life, and doubling of RAM from 64 to 128 MB.

N95 CHINA (N95-5) 
Featuring the internal name RM-245, the N95-5 was targeted at the Chinese market. The main difference from the regular N95 was the lack of any 3G connectivity support, which has not been yet adopted in China at the time of release, and the absence of WLAN connectivity, due to Chinese regulations.

N95 8GB CHINA (N95-6) 
The N95-6, internally coded RM-321 was a Chinese market-targeted version of the N95-2, lacking 3G and WLAN support just like the N95-5.

Versions comparison 
This table lists only the specifications that differ between versions of the N95 models.

Cancelled revision
In late 2020, prototype videos surfaced of a planned revision of the N95 that was never put into production, which included slide-out media controls and speakers, and a kickstand.

Ad slogans 
 English: "It's what computers have become."
 Latvian language: "Tagad dators izskatās tā." (Translated "Now a computer looks like this.")
 Russian language: "Таким я знаю компьютер" (Translated "That is how I know my computer to be.")
 Serbian language: "У шта су се рачунари претворили." (Translated "This is what computers have become".)

See also 
 Nokia Nseries

References

External links 

 Official Nokia N95 8GB Technical Specifications (forums.nokia.com version) 
 Official Nokia N95-3 North America Technical Specifications (forums.nokia.com version)
 Official Nokia N95 Product Page
 Official Nokia N95 Support Page
 Official Nokia Press Release

N-Gage (service) compatible devices
Mobile phones introduced in 2007
Slider phones
Nokia Nseries
Mobile phones with user-replaceable battery
Mobile phones with infrared transmitter